Lyudmila Veselkova ((née Semeniuta; born 25 October 1950) is a retired female middle distance runner, who represented the USSR in the 1970s and the early 1980s. She set her personal best in the women's 800 metres (1:55.96) on 8 September 1982 at the European Championships in Athens, Greece.

References
Profile

1950 births
Living people
Soviet female middle-distance runners
Russian female middle-distance runners
European Athletics Championships medalists